Slick Airways was a cargo airline from the United States, that operated scheduled and chartered flights between 1946 and 1966. The airline was founded by Earl Slick, a Texas aviator and multimillionaire who along with his brother had inherited $25 million (around $324 million in 2015 currency) after their father's death in 1930.

History

The airline was formed in January 1946 as the air cargo division of the Slick Corporation, headquartered in San Antonio. Slick Airways had its original fleet of Curtiss C-46 Commando aircraft based at Lockheed Air Terminal (Burbank) and San Francisco Airport. In 1949, scheduled freighter flights to domestic destinations were commenced, and by 1951, the company had become the largest all-cargo airline of the United States. On 16 April of that year, Slick Airways became the first airline to operate the freighter variant of the Douglas DC-6 (the passenger variant had been introduced with United Airlines five days earlier).

In 1954, Slick Airways went into merger talks with Flying Tigers because of the increasing competition by passenger airlines, which failed because the respective shareholders would not approve of these plans. In 1958, the company was forced to suspend all scheduled services, though it continued to operate charter flights on behalf of the United States Armed Forces, also to European destinations. A fleet of newly built Lockheed L-1049 Super Constellation airliners went into service with the airline during 1959, initially being used to fly military freight from Travis Air Force Base near Sacramento to Japan. This operation was supplemented by Canadair CL-44s from 1962.

In October 1962 scheduled flights were resumed, when Slick Airways was granted permanent permission to operate its transcontinental Route 101. The trunk routing went from either San Francisco or Burbank to Dallas, St. Louis, Chicago, Indianapolis and New York City and was operated using the Lockheed Super Constellation. The DC-6 was used on side routes. Additionally, Slick Airways operated on so called Quicktrans domestic routes on behalf of the United States Navy. In 1965, the L-1049 was withdrawn from the Route 101 in favor of the CL-44.

On 27 August 1965, scheduled flights once again were discontinued because of the poor financial situation of Slick Airways, and military charter flights were terminated by the end of the year. On 1 July 1966, Slick Airways was shut down, and the assets were acquired by Airlift International.

Fleet
Over the years, Slick Airways operated the following aircraft types:
 Canadair CL-44
 Curtiss C-46 Commando
 Douglas DC-4
 Douglas DC-6
 Douglas DC-8
 Lockheed L-1049 Super Constellation

Accidents and incidents
Slick Airways suffered nine accidents resulting in an aircraft being damaged beyond repair. In total, 19 people lost their lives.
 In 1947, three of the company's Curtiss C-46 Commando aircraft crashed. 
 On 14 February 1947 at 04:20 local time, the C-46 registered NC59486 crashed during a flawed ILS approach into Stapleton Airfield, killing the two pilots. 
 On 21 August 1947 at 06:11, the three persons on board a C-46 (registered NC59488) flying from Denver to Los Angeles died when the aircraft crashed into a canyon wall near Hanksville, Utah in stormy and cloudy weather, a typical controlled flight into terrain. 
 On 17 September 1947 at 11:12, another C-46 (registered NC59495) was destroyed in a landing accident at Lockheed Air Terminal in Burbank. On its flight from Denver, the crew had encountered strong headwinds, which caused a complete fuel starvation. An emergency landing was carried out on a taxiway, and the aircraft skidded across an adjacent highway and railroad track. The two pilots survived.
 On 16 May 1948, the two pilots of a C-46 (registered NC59489) were killed when the aircraft crashed near Port Columbus International Airport at 20:42. They had been flying from New York City to Chicago, when they encountered severe turbulences, in which the rudder of the plane was damaged, rendering it uncontrollable.
 On 9 October 1949 at 17:54, another C-46 (registered NC59485) crashed whilst approaching Cheyenne Regional Airport in heavy winds and icing conditions, killing the three persons on board. On 23 February 1951, another C-46 (registered N59490) encountered severe icing during a flight from Burbank to San Francisco. The pilots carried out a forced landing on a highway near Newhall, California. This time, there were no fatalities.
 On 4 March 1953, a Slick Airways C-46 (registered N4717N) crashed during approach of Windsor Locks-Bradley Field on a flight from New York City, killing the two pilots. After a missed approach in stormy conditions, the pilot had lost control of the aircraft and flown into trees at 01:50 local time.
 On 3 February 1963 at 12:07, a Lockheed L-1049 Super Constellation (registered N9740Z) hit runway approach lights during a flawed landing attempt at San Francisco Airport, and crashed subsequently. Of the eight people on board, four survived the accident.
 On 10 March 1964 at 08:22, a Douglas DC-4 (registered N384) crashed during approach at Logan Airport, killing the three occupants. It was determined that the pilots had lost control of the airplane because of ice accretion.

See also 
 List of defunct airlines of the United States

References

Bibliography
 Marson, Peter. The Lockheed Constellation Series. 1982. Air-Britain (Historians) Ltd. .
 

Defunct airlines of the United States
Airlines established in 1946
Airlines disestablished in 1966
1946 establishments in Texas